Most gold mining in Virginia was concentrated in the Virginia Gold-Pyrite belt in a line that runs northeast to southwest through the counties of Fairfax, Prince William, Stafford, Fauquier, Culpeper, Spotsylvania, Orange, Louisa, Fluvanna, Goochland, Cumberland, and Buckingham. Some gold was also mined in Halifax, Floyd, and Patrick counties.

History of Virginia gold mining

The earliest recording of gold mining activity in Virginia began about 1804 as placer mining, followed quickly by lode mining. Mining continued unabated until the onset of the California Gold Rush, at which point most serious speculators moved west. Production continued at a low level until the Civil War, when it virtually ground to a halt.

Near the end of the war, Union troops began a systematic campaign to destroy the economic base of the South. Many gold mines were subsequently damaged beyond repair. Most were, by this time, marginal producers, their ores of such low concentrate as to stretch the limits of the mercury amalgam (chemistry) recovery technology of the day. Many of these mines never reopened.

Other mines did, however, and gold production in Virginia continued until World War II, when, on October 8, 1942, the War Production Board issued Limitation Order L-208, which branded gold production as a non-essential and directed all but the smallest of gold mines to shut down so their labor force could be used elsewhere to support the war effort.

Economic conditions following the war were such that few miners returned to mining, so only a handful of mines reopened. For all practical purposes, commercial gold production in Virginia ceased after 1948.

At its peak, Virginia was the third largest gold producing state, and the heart of the gold production area was at the junction of Spotsylvania, Culpeper, Greene near Wood Dr., and Orange counties near Wilderness.

Modern era 

More than 300 prospects and mines are known to have existed in Virginia, yet very few, if any at all, are commercially active at this time. Amateur and hobby prospecting continues to this day, primarily consisting of individual or small scale placer operations. Many hobbyists simply use a gold pan or a sluice box.

Museums and displays about gold mining 

Lake Anna State Park contains the remnants of the Goodwin mine and some historical displays. Gold panning is permitted on the park grounds.
Monroe Park in Goldvein has a museum about gold mining operations in the area, with some reconstructed buildings and historical artifacts.

List of gold mines, claims, and prospects

Since most commercial gold activity ceased in the late 1940s, records are scant. This list is not complete.
quadrangles are USGS 7.5 minute quads and the coordinates are UTM.

Mines in Buckingham County

Anaconda mine 
Quadrangle: Dillwyn
Location: N 4,165,950 E 729,000 (Zone 17)
Anderson mine 
Quadrangle: Andersonville
Location:N 4,149,050 E 715,050 (Zone 17)
Apperson mine 
Quadrangle: Dillwyn
Location: N 4,160,830 E 724,830 (Zone 17)
Bondurant mine  
Quadrangle: Andersonville
Location:N 4,147,630 E 713,180 (Zone 17)
Buckingham (Wiseman) mine 
Quadrangle: Dillwyn
Location: N 4,158,740 E 723,820 (Zone 17)
Burnett (Staples) mine 
Quadrangle: Dillwyn
Location: N 4,160,010 E 724,400 (Zone 17)
Copal (Kopall) mine 
Quadrangle: Andersonville
Location: N 4,147,580 E 715,500 (Zone 17)
Duncan mine 
Quadrangle: Dillwyn
Location: N 4,163,050 E 726,150 (Zone 17)
Flood (James Anderson's) mine 
Quadrangle: Andersonville
Location: N 4,146.340 E 712.190 (Zone 17)
Ford mine 
Quadrangle: Diana Mills
Location: N 4,174,840 E 730,820 (Zone 17)
Gilliam mine 
Quadrangle: Andersonville
Location: N 4,145,400 E 711,420 (Zone 17)
Greelsy (Ayers) mine 
Quadrangle: Dillwyn
Location: N 4,162,120 E 730,510 (Zone 17)
Hudgins mine 
Quadrangle: Arvonia
Location: N 4,173,530 E 737,360 (Zone 17)
Lightfoot (Cowan) mine  
Quadrangle: Diana Mills
Location: N 4,175,860 E 731,370 (Zone 17)
London and Virginia mine 
Quadrangle: Dillwyn
Location: N 4,418,860 E 723,980 (Zone 17)
Morrow (Booker, Garnett, Moseley) mine  
Quadrangle: Willis Mountain
Location: N 4,152,590 E 721,570 (Zone 17)
Morton (Hobson) mine 
Quadrangle: Dillwyn
Location: N 4,166,920 E 728,800 (Zone 17)
Philadelphia (Allen)mine 
Quadrangle: Dillwyn
Location: Near the London and Virginia mine.
Rough and Ready mine 
Quadrangle: Dillwyn
Location:N 4,166,270 E 728,470 (Zone 17)
Seay mine
Quadrangle: Willis Mountain
Location:N 4,152,770 E 721,350 (Zone 17)
Williams mine 
Quadrangle: Dillwyn
Location:N 4,158,070 E 723,130 (Zone 17)
Willis Creek mine
Quadrangle: Andersonville
Location:N 4,146,230 E 710,500 (Zone 17)
Mines with insufficient data
Piedmont mine 
Walker mine

Mines in Carroll County

Woodlawn mine 
Quadrangle: Woodlawn
Location: N 4,063,540 E 515,020 (Zone 17)

Mines in Culpeper County

Childsburg (Childsbury) mine 
Quadrangle: Richardsville
Location: N 4,255,260 E 263,870 (Zone 18)
Cromarty mine 
Quadrangle: Richardsville
Location: N 4,253,500 E 264,790 (Zone 18)
Culpeper (Hempstead) mine 
Quadrangle: Chancellorsville
Location: N 4,250,700 E 262,790 (Zone 18)
Dry Bottom mine 
Quadrangle: Richardsville
Location: N 4,251,940 E 265,010 (Zone 18)
Eagle mine 
Quadrangle: Richardsville
Location: N 4,251,530 E 263,720 (Zone 18)
Ellis (Eley) mine 
Quadrangle: Richardsville
Location: N 4,254,840 E 264,930 (Zone 18)
Embrey (Embry, Embry and Brooks) mine 
Quadrangle: Chancellorsville
Location: N 4,250,230 E 263,120 (Zone 18)
Field's mine 
Quadrangle: Germanna Bridge
Location: N 4,255,760 E 259,790 (Zone 18)
Greeley Horace mine 
Quadrangle: Richardsville
Location: N 4,251,330 E 263,520 (Zone 18)
Hill mine 
Quadrangle: Castleton
Location: N 4,265,890 E 760,320 (Zone 17)
Love mine 
Quadrangle: Richardsville
Location: N 4,251,560 E 263,060 (Zone 18)
Milbank (Millbank) mine 
Quadrangle: Richardsville
Location: East-northeast of Richardsville, south of the Rappahannock River.
Morganna (Morgana) mine 
Quadrangle: Richardsville
Location: N 4,255,490 E 266,300 (Zone 18)
Ricardsville mine 
Quadrangle: Richardsville
Location: Near Richardsville
Rossin's (Rossin's Mountain) mine 
Quadrangle: Richardsville
Location: N 4,252,260 E 262,600 (Zone 18)
Smith mine 
Quadrangle: Chancellorsville
Location: N 4,250,490 E 264,450 (Zone 18)
Urquhart mine 
Quadrangle: Richardsville
Location: N 4,254,490 E 264,450 (Zone 18)
Mines that had insufficient data 
Enterprise
Everlasting
Pennsylvania

Mines in Cumberland County

Dickey, C. S. mine 
Quadrangle: Lakeside Village
Location: N 4,175,660 E 751,780 (Zone 17)

Mines in Fairfax County
Bull Neck (Kirk) mine 
Quadrangle: Falls Church
Location: N 4,315,060 E 307,990 (Zone 18)

Mines in Fauquier County
Fauquier County's Gold Mining Museum at Monroe Park
Bancroft (Bancroff) mine (2 mines) 
Quadrangle: Richardsville
Location: N 4,262,340 E 262,680 / N 4,261,490 E 263,260 (Zone 18)
Cool Spring (Stringfellow) mine 
Quadrangle: Richardsville
Location: N 4,260,180 E 266,920 (Zone 18)
Embrey mine 
Quadrangle: Midland
Location: N 4,264,900 E 264,190 (Zone 18)
Emigold mine 
Quadrangle: Richardsville
Location: Near Goldvein, Va
Franklin (Deep Run) mine
Quadrangle: Midland
Location: 4,264,710 E 267,970 (Zone 18)
First mine in the county, opened in 1825.
Gamewood mine 
Quadrangle: Richardsville
Location: N 4,261,890 (Zone 18)
Johnston mine 
Quadrangle: Richardsville
Location: N 4,256,800 E 268,140 (Zone 18)
Kelly (Kelley)mine 
Quadrangle: Richardsville
Location: N 4,260,340 E 260,100 (Zone 18)
Kidwell mine 
Quadrangle: Richardsville
Location: N 4,258,130 E 260,830 (Zone 18)
Kirk mine 
Quadrangle: Richardsville
Location: N 4,264,060 E 267,680 (Zone 18)
Liberty mine 
Quadrangle: Richardsville
Location: N 4,259,310 E 266,380 (Zone 18)
Liepold (Leopold, Stone) mine 
Quadrangle: Richardsville
Location: N 4,263,940 E 263,970 (Zone 18)
Little Elliot mine 
Quadrangle: Richardsville
Location: N 4,260,450 E 266,450 (Zone 18)
Pine View mine 
Quadrangle: Richardsville
Location: N 4,259,640 E 265,380 (Zone 18)
Pollard (Polland) mine 
Quadrangle: Richardsville
Location: N 4,261,520 E 261,360 (Zone 18)
Randolph (Sugar) mine 
Quadrangle: Richardsville
Location: N 4,260,940 E 266,210 (Zone 18)
Union mine 
Quadrangle: Richardsville
Location: N 4,258,030 E 265,730 (Zone 18)
Waterman mine 
Quadrangle: Midland
Location: N 4,264,470 E 267,570 (Zone 18)
Wykoff (Wycoff, Quartz) mine 
Quadrangle: Richardsville
Location: N 4,263,020 E 266,640 (Zone 18)

Mines in Floyd County
Black Run mine 
Quadrangle: Floyd
Brush Creek mine 
Quadrangle: Pilot
Location: N 4,100,810 E 561,200 (Zone 17)
Laurel Creek mine 
Quadrangle: Pilot
Location: N 4,097,270 E 560,250 (Zone 17)
McAlexander, Lester (Luster) mine 
Quadrangle: Alum Ridge

Mines in Fluvanna County

Bartlett mine 
Quadrangle: Columbia
Bowles mine 
Quadrangle: Caledonia
Location: N 4,194,540 E 755,890 (Zone 17)
Cassell's mine 
Quadrangle: Columbia
Location: N 4,191,490 E 751,390 (Zone 17)
Cocke mine 
Quadrangle: Columbia
Location: N 4,188,600 E 751,060 (Zone 17)
Fountain mine 
Quadrangle: Columbia
Location: N 4,189,630 E 751,990 (Zone 17)
Hughes mine 
Quadrangle: Palmyra
Location: N 4,185,510 E 738,510 (Zone 17)
Jennings mine 
Quadrangle: Caledonia
Location: N 4,191,320 E 753,710 (Zone 17)
Marks, Lemuel mine 
Quadrangle: Columbia
Location: N 4,190,560 E 752,960 (Zone 17)
McGloam mine 
Quadrangle: Caledonia
Location: N 4,193,320 E 754,840 (Zone 17)
Mosby mine 
Quadrangle: Columbia
Location: N 4,190,110 E 752,590 (Zone 17)
Page mine 
Quadrangle: Columbia
Location: N 4,192,390 E 743,960 (Zone 17)
Previous User contribution:(Believe this should be the "Long Island Mine", named after the Long Island Creek in Fluvanna where it was located. It was established by George Pace in the 1830s, and thus is also commonly called "the Pace Mine".)
Prospect A 
Quadrangle: Caledonia
Location: N 4,190,920 E 753,780 (Zone 17)
Prospect B 
Quadrangle: Caledonia
Location: N 4,190,420 E 753,680 (Zone 17)
Scotia (Hodges vein) mine 
Quadrangle: Caledonia
Location: N 4,190,740 E 754,090 (Zone 17)
Scotia (Perkins, Telluruim Vein) mine 
Quadrangle: Caledonia
Location: N 4,191,920 E 754,410 (Zone 17)
Shaw (2 mines) mine 
Quadrangle: Caledonia
Location: N 4,194,260 E 755,130 / N 4,195,130 E 755,150 (Zone 17)
Snead mine 
Quadrangle: Palmyra
Location: N 4,184,760 E 741,590 (Zone 17)
Stockton Tunnel mine 
Quadrangle: Columbia
Location: N 4,193,840 E 744,450 (Zone 17)
Tellurium mine 
Quadrangle: Caledonia
Location: N 4,192,220 E 754,650 (Zone 17)
Mines that had insufficient data 
Chalk Level

Mines in Goochland County

Atmore (Admore) mine 
Quadrangle: Caledonia
Location: N 4,188,140 E 754,470 (Zone 17)
Belzord (Belzora, Belzow) mine 
Quadrangle: Caledonia
Location: N 4,188,850 E 756,170 (Zone 17)
Benton mine 
Quadrangle: Caledonia
Location: N 4,194,810 E 758,690 (Zone 17)
Bertha and Edith (2 mines) mine 
Quadrangle: Caledonia / Columbia
Location: N 4,185,880 E 753,100 / N 4,187,300 E 753,100 (Zone 17)
Big Bird mine 
Quadrangle: Caledonia
Location: N 4,188,670 E 756,130 (Zone 17)
Bowles (Boles) mine 
Quadrangle: Caledonia
Location: N 4,192,580 E 755,360 (Zone 17)
Busby (Busbee, Groom) mine 
Quadrangle: Caledonia
Location: N 4,193,110 E 756,980 (Zone 17)
Chatlier mine 
Quadrangle: Caledonia
Location: N 4,191,720 E 754,900 (Zone 17)
Collins mine 
Quadrangle: Caledonia
Location: N 4,189,130 E 757,160 (Zone 17)
 the first gold mine in Goochland county
Dillard mine 
Quadrangle: Columbia
Duke mine 
Quadrangle: Caledonia
Location: N 4,188,670 E 755,580 (Zone 17)
Eades mine 
Quadrangle: Caledonia
Location: N 4,188,670 E 756,130 (Zone 17)
Fisher mine 
Quadrangle: Caledonia
Location: N 4,191,260 E 755,750 (Zone 17)
Fleming (Hodge's) mine 
Quadrangle: Caledonia
Location: N 4,194,730 E 759,000 (Zone 17)
Goochland mine 
Quadrangle: Caledonia
Location: Around the headwaters of Little Byrd Creek.
Grannison (2 mines) mine 
Quadrangle: Caledonia
Location: N 4,189,060 E 754,030 / N 4,188,690 E 754,520 (Zone 17)
Johnson, David mine 
Quadrangle: Caledonia
Location: N 4,190,000 E 756,490 (Zone 17)
Kent (2 mines) mine 
Quadrangle: Caledonia
Location: N 4,187,970 E 753,750 / N 4,187,600 E 753,750 (Zone 17)
Laury mine 
Quadrangle: Caledonia
Location: N 4,188,670 E 756,130 (Zone 17)
Marks, Lancelot mine 
Quadrangle: Caledonia
Location: N 4,188,670 E 756,130 (Zone 17)
Massachusetts mine 
Quadrangle: Caledonia
Location: Within  of the Terllurium mine.
Morgan (Robert Hughes) mine 
Quadrangle: Caledonia
Location: N 4,189,370 E 755,920 (Zone 17)
Moss mine 
Quadrangle: Caledonia
Location: N 4,192,720 E 756,450 (Zone 17)
Omohundro mine 
Quadrangle: Caledonia
Location: N 4,190,320 E 756,260 (Zone 17)
Payne mine 
Quadrangle: Caledonia
Location: N 4,193,690 E 757,620 (Zone 17)
Prospect A 
Quadrangle: Caledonia
Location: N 4,193,280 E 756,590 (Zone 17)
Prospect B 
Quadrangle: Caledonia
Location: N 4,193,100 E 756,280 (Zone 17)
Prospect C 
Quadrangle: Caledonia
Location: N 4,192,250 E 755,480 (Zone 17)
Pryor (Pryer) mine 
Quadrangle: Caledonia
Location: N 4,192,230 E 757,230 (Zone 17)
Ruth 
Quadrangle: Columbia
Shannon Hill mine 
Quadrangle: Caledonia
Location: N 4,195,680 E 760,100 (Zone 17)
Tellurium (Fisher, Hughes, Red) mine 
Quadrangle: Caledonia
Location: N 4,192,420 E 755,030 (Zone 17)
where it is believed that the first stamp mill in the U.S. operated
Thompson, John mine 
Quadrangle: Caledonia
Location: N 4,189,530 E 756,340 (Zone 17)
Toler mine 
Quadrangle: Caledonia
Location: N 4,188,720 E 755,900 (Zone 17)
Waller mine 
Quadrangle: Caledonia
Location: N 4,193,910 E 759,090 (Zone 17)
Young American (Gilmer, Gilmore) (2 mines) mine 
Quadrangle: Caledonia
Location: N 4,190,010 E 756,240 / N 4,189,900 E 756,010 (Zone 17)
Mines that had insufficient data
Argus mine 
Banks mine 
Johnson, Benjamin mine 
Manning mine 
McGee mine 
Moon Sea mine 
Nicholas mine 
Pace mine 
Richmond mine 
Taugus mine 
Tyler mine 
Walters mine

Mines in Halifax County
Luce and Howard (Howard, Tallyhill) mine 
Quadrangle: Nelson
Location: N 4,052,860 E 701,730 (Zone 17)
Poole and Harris (Pool) mine 
Quadrangle: Nelson
Location: N 4,050,120 E 701,770 (Zone 17)
Red Bank (Goldbank) mine 
Quadrangle: Nelson
Location: N 4,052,590 E 701,700 (Zone 17)

Mines in Loudoun County
Loudoun mine 
Quadrangle: Harpers Ferry

Mines in Louisa County

Allah Cooper (Ali Cooper, Valcooper, Alley-Cooper) mine 
Quadrangle: Lake Anna West
Location: N 4,217,670 E 249,180 (Zone 18)
Belden mine 
Quadrangle: Mineral
Location: N 4,211,570 E 249,180 (Zone 18)
Bibb mine 
Quadrangle: Mineral
Location: N 4,210,130 E 246,440 (Zone 18)
Boxley's mine 
Quadrangle: Lake Anna West
Chick mine 
Quadrangle: Mineral
Location: N 4,210,880 E 246,880 (Zone 18)
Cooper mine 
Quadrangle: Mineral
Location: N 4,213,140 E 245,430 (Zone 18)
Harris mine 
Quadrangle: Mineral
Location: N 4,210,310 E 246,560 (Zone 18)
Jenkins mine 
Quadrangle: Lake Anna West
Location: N 4,216,520 E 248,960 (Zone 18)
Lett mine 
Quadrangle: Mineral
Location: N 4,212,080 E 244,880 (Zone 18)
Louisa mine 
Quadrangle: Pendleton
Location: N 4,207,490 E 245,280 (Zone 18)
Luce mine 
Quadrangle: Pendleton
Location: N 4,208,410 E 245,260 (Zone 18)
MacDonald mine 
Quadrangle: Pendleton
Location: N 4,209,180 E 242,560 (Zone 18)
Morriston mine 
Quadrangle: Mineral 
Location: N 4,210,720 E 246,800 (Zone 18)
New Luce mine 
Quadrangle: Pendleton
Location: N 4,209,020 E 245,670 (Zone 18)
Proffit mine 
Quadrangle: Pendleton
Location: N 4,206,950 E 243,670 (Zone 18)
Ricswan mine 
Quadrangle: Pendleton
Location: N 4,207,690 E 244,490 (Zone 18)
Slate Hill mine 
Quadrangle: Pendleton
Location: N 4,207,930 E 244,740 (Zone 18)
Stockton mine 
Quadrangle: Mineral
Location: N 4,210,780 E 246,780 (Zone 18)
Thomasson's mine 
Quadrangle: Pendleton
Location: N 4,205,840 E 242,640 (Zone 18)
Tinder (Tinder Flats) mine 
Quadrangle: Lake Anne West
Location: N 4,216,660 E 248,020 (Zone 18)
Triple Fork mine 
Quadrangle: Mineral
Twin Vein mine 
Quadrangle: Pendleton
Walnut Grove mine 
Quadrangle: Pendleton
Location: N 4,205,640 E 242,480 (Zone 18)
Walton mine 
Quadrangle: Mineral
Location: N 4,212,810 E 245,180 (Zone 18)
Warren Hill mine 
Quadrangle: -
Location: On the "Fisher Lode"
 Mines by another user contributions
Armenious mine, located somewhere near Mineral, location uncertain
Dolan mine
Hunter prospect, located about  NW of Mineral south of SR-22
Josh mine, located about  SW of Yanceyville

Mines in Montgomery County

Brush Creek mine 
Quadrangle: Pilot
Location: N 4,100,370 E 560,420 (Zone 17)

Mines in Orange County
Ambler mine 
Quadrangle: Chancellorsville
Location: N 4,244,510 E 260,150 (Zone 18)
Dickey mine 
Quadrangle: Mine Run
Location: N 4,240,540 E 249,650 (Zone 18)
Gordon's, H (2 mines) mine 
Quadrangle: -
Location: N 4,247,870 E 258,640 / N 4,247,540 E 258,480 (Zone 18)
Grasty mine 
Quadrangle: Mine Run
Location: N 4,240,470 E 249,470 (Zone 18)
Greenwood (Laird) mine 
Quadrangle: Chancellorsville
Location: N 4,247,180 E 261,930 (Zone 18)
Jones mine 
Quadrangle: Mine Run
Location: N 4,248,500 E 254,140 (Zone 18)
Melville (Rapidan) mine 
Quadrangle: Chancellorsville
Location: N 4,249,140 E 261,930 (Zone 18)
Old Tinder mine 
Quadrangle: Mine Run
Location: N 4,240,350 E 249,370 (Zone 18)
Orange Grove mine 
Quadrangle: Mine Run
Location: N 4,246,420 E 258,070 (Zone 18)
Partridge mine 
Quadrangle: Chancellorsville
Location: N 4,248,830 E 259,860 (Zone 18)
Prospect A mine 
Quadrangle: Chancellorsville
Location: N 4,244,790 E 260,390 (Zone 18)
Saunders (2 mines) mine 
Quadrangle: Lahore
Location: N 4,235,290 E 245,470 (Zone 18)
Seldon mine 
Quadrangle: Lahore
Location: N 4,235,330 E 248,270 (Zone 18)
Somerville mine 
Quadrangle: Chancellorsville
Location: Just west of Wilderness.
Stuart mine 
Quadrangle: Lahore
Location: N 4,234,870 E 242,930 (Zone 18)
Vaucluse (Grimes, Grymes)(2 mines) mine 
Quadrangle: Chancellorsville
Location: N 4,248,390 E 261,560 / N 4,248,220 E 261,430 / N 4,248,110 E 261,390 (Zone 18)
Wilderness mine 
Quadrangle: Chancellorsville
Location: N 4,246,430 E 261,240 (Zone 18)
Woodman mine 
Quadrangle: Mine Run
Location: Lower Orange County
Woodville mine 
Quadrangle: Chancellorsville
Location: N 4,246,140 E 260,630 (Zone 18)
Young mine 
Quadrangle: Lahore
Location: N 4,234,670 E 245,020 (Zone 18)

Mines with insufficient data
Randolph mine

Mines in Patrick County

Polebridge Creek mine 
Quadrangle: Patrick Springs
Location: N 4,064,570 E 576,340 (Zone 17)

Mines in Prince William County

Cabin Branch (Dumfries) mine 
Quadrangle: Patrick Springs
Location: N 4,271,980 E 295,420 (Zone 18)
Crawford (Neabsco Creek) mine 
Quadrangle: Quantico
Location: N 4,277,360 E 299,620 (Zone 18)
Greenwood Gold Mine
Quadrangle: Independent Hill
Location: N 4,278,360 E 288,260 (Zone 18)

Mines in Spotsylvania County
Anderson's mine 
Quadrangle: Belmont
Beazley mine  
Quadrangle: Belmont
Location: N 4,236,840 E 258,660 (Zone 18)
Bell mine  
Quadrangle: Salem Church
Location: N 4,246,140 E 274,320 (Zone 18)
Brinton mine  
Quadrangle: Chancellorsville
Location: N 4,248,350 E 269,930 (Zone 18)
Faws Tract mine  
Quadrangle: Chancellorsville
Furnace mine  
Quadrangle: Chancellorsville
Location: N 4,240,960 E 267,950 (Zone 18)
Gardiner mine  
Quadrangle: Salem Church
Location: N 4,245,730 E 271,870 (Zone 18)
Goodwyn (Goodwins, Pocahontas) mine  
Quadrangle: Chancellorsville
Location: N 4,244,820 E 254,030 (Zone 18)
Grindstone Hill mine  
Quadrangle: Belmont
Location: N 4,230,790 E 257,780 (Zone 18)
Higgins (Huggin's) mine  
Quadrangle: Brokenburg
Location: On Upper Po River, near the Whitehall mine.
Horde mine  
Quadrangle: Salem Church
Location: Near the United States Ford at confluence of Rapidan and Rappahannock Rivers.
Hunting Run mine 
Quadrangle: Chancellorsville
Location: N 4,246,630 E 267,790 (Zone 18)
Johnston's (Johnston) mine 
Quadrangle: Belmont
Location: N 4,229,740 E 258,440 (Zone 18)
Julian mine 
Quadrangle: Salem Church
Location: Tract lies near southwest bank of the Rappahannock River.
Knapp (New Dominion) mine 
Quadrangle: Belmont
Location: N 4,224,810 E 254,260 (Zone 18)
Marsden mine 
Quadrangle: Chancellorsville
Location: N 4,240,150 E 262,150 (Zone 18)

Mitchell (Old Dominion, Emily)  mine 
Quadrangle: Belmont
Location: N 4,228,700 E 256,340 (Zone 18)
Mott mine 
Quadrangle: Salem Church
Location: N 4,244,630 E 275,710 (Zone 18)
New Grindstone mine 
Quadrangle: Belmont
Location: N 4,231,210 E 256,780 (Zone 18)
Powell's (Powells, Jerdones) mine 
Quadrangle: Brokenburg
Location: N 4,232,270 E 259,440 (Zone 18)
Prospect A 
Quadrangle: Chancellorsville
Location: N 4,243,350 E 266,790 (Zone 18)
Prospect B 
Quadrangle: Belmont
Location: N 4,230,750 E 256,550 (Zone 18)
Quaker mine 
Quadrangle: Chancellorsville
Location: N 4,238,590 E 265,430 (Zone 18)
Ramsey mine 
Quadrangle: Salem Church
Location: N 4,246,850 E 274,860 (Zone 18)
Randolph mine 
Quadrangle: Brokenburg
Location: N 4,236,570 E 261,310 (Zone 18)
Rawlings mine 
Quadrangle: Belmont
Location: N 4,231,450 E 257,010 (Zone 18)
Roney mine 
Quadrangle: Belmont
Location: N 4,232,650 E 258,130 (Zone 18)
Smith mine 
Quadrangle: Salem Church
Location: N 4,245,370 E 273,670 (Zone 18)
Starrs (Stajar's Stairs) mine 
Quadrangle: Belmont
Location: N 4,225,110 E 254,060 (Zone 18)
Trigg mine 
Quadrangle: Chancellorsville
Location: Near Brockville (now Bockroad), According to Spotsylvania County Deed books, the old mine is located near Stephens Station on the south side of the Old Potomac, Piedmont and Fredericksburg Railway; a tract of approximately  bounded by lands of Oscar Todd, George Rowe Welford and Alexander B. Hawkins.
UNITED STATES (Welford) mine 
Quadrangle: Salem Church
Location: N 4,248,480 E 270,940 (Zone 18)
Valzinco (Halladay, Holloday)  mine 
Quadrangle: Belmont
Location: N 4,228,850 E 254,940 (Zone 18)
Whitehall mine 
Quadrangle: Brokenburg
Location: N 4,235,680 E 260,320 (Zone 18)
Mines with insufficient data
Donnings mine 
Gold Flat mine 
Marshall mine 
Pulliam (Pullman) mine 
Quisenberry mine 
Spotsylvania mine

Mines in Stafford County

Eagle (Rappahannock, Smith, Morgan and Rappahannock)  mine 
Quadrangle: Salem Church
Location: N 4,249,440 E 272,560 (Zone 18)
Elliot Farm mine 
Quadrangle: Salem Church
Location: N 4,250,400 E 272,290 (Zone 18)
Horse Pen (Horse Pin, Hospen, Rattlesnake) (2 mines) mine 
Quadrangle: Salem Church
Location: N 4,248,860 E 274,170 / N 4,248,750 E 274,020 (Zone 18)
Lee mine 
Quadrangle: Salem Church
Location: N 4,249,290 E 275,130 (Zone 18)
MacDonald mine 
Quadrangle: Salem Church
Location: N 4,249,720 E 274,280 (Zone 18)
Monroe mine 
Quadrangle: Salem Church
Location: N 4,250,370 E 271,960 (Zone 18)
New Hope (Newhope) mine 
Quadrangle: Storck
Location: N 4,252,240 E 276,060 (Zone 18)
Pris-King (2 shafts) mine 
Quadrangle: Salem Church
Location: N 4,250,140 E 273,160 / N 4,250,000 E 273,090 (Zone 18)
Prospect A 
Quadrangle: Salem Church
Location: N 4,249,830 E 272,920 (Zone 18)
Wiseman mine 
Quadrangle: Salem Church
Location: N 4,247,920 E 273,240 (Zone 18)
Mines with insufficient data
Brower mine 
Fairview mine 
Stafford mine

Mines in Warren County
Gooney-Manor mine 
Quadrangle: Front Royal
Location: N 4,307,220 E 739,340 (Zone 17)

Other mines, claims, and prospects

Crawford placer prospect, in Dale City on Neabsco Creek about 500 yards west of I-95

References

Further reading

War Production Board Limitation Order L—208, 7 Fed.Reg. 7992—7993

External links
 Virginia Department of Mines Minerals and Energy:  Gold
 Fauquier County's Gold Mining Museum at Monroe Park

Virginia
Economy of Virginia
Mining in Virginia